A space habitat (also called a space settlement, space colony, spacestead, space city, orbital habitat, orbital settlement, orbital colony, orbital stead or orbital city) is a more advanced form of living quarters than a space station or habitation module, in that it is intended as a permanent settlement or green habitat rather than as a simple way-station or other specialized facility. No space habitat has been constructed yet, but many design concepts, with varying degrees of realism, have come both from engineers and from science-fiction authors.

The term space habitat sometimes includes more broadly habitats built on or in a body other than Earth—such as the Moon, Mars or an asteroid. This article concentrates on self-contained structures envisaged for micro-g environments.

Definition
A space habitat, or more precisely a space settlement, is any large-scale habitation facility in space, or more particularly in outer space or an orbit. A space habitat is typically designed to rotate so as to prevent long-term exposure of its residents to the peril of weightlessness or microgravity; studies have shown rotation to be a healthy substitute for gravity.

While not automatically constituting a colonial entity, a space habitat can be an element of a space colony. The term ’space colony’ has been viewed critically, prompting Carl Sagan to propose the term space city.

History
The idea of space habitats either in fact or fiction goes back to the second half of the 19th century. "The Brick Moon", a fictional story written in 1869 by Edward Everett Hale, is perhaps the first treatment of this idea in writing. In 1903, space pioneer Konstantin Tsiolkovsky speculated about rotating cylindrical space habitats, with plants fed by the sun, in Beyond Planet Earth. In the 1920s John Desmond Bernal and others speculated about giant space habitats. Dandridge M. Cole in the late 1950s and 1960s speculated about hollowing out asteroids and then rotating them to use as settlements in various magazine articles and books, notably Islands In Space: The Challenge Of The Planetoids.

Motivation

There are a range of reasons for space habitats. Beside human spaceflight supported space exploration and space colonization, reasons for space habitats include:
 Survival of human civilization and the biosphere, in case of a disaster on the Earth (natural or man-made)
 Huge resources in space for expansion of human society
 Expansion without any ecosystems to destroy or indigenous peoples to displace
 It could help the Earth by relieving population pressure and taking industry off-Earth.

Advantages
A number of arguments are made for space habitats having a number of advantages:

Access to solar energy
Space has an abundance of light produced from the Sun. In Earth orbit, this amounts to 1400 watts of power per square meter. This energy can be used to produce electricity from solar cells or heat engine based power stations, process ores, provide light for plants to grow and to warm space habitats.

Outside gravity well
Earth-to-space habitat trade would be easier than Earth-to-planetary habitat trade, as habitats orbiting Earth will not have a gravity well to overcome to export to Earth, and a smaller gravity well to overcome to import from Earth.

In-situ resource utilization
Space habitats may be supplied with resources from extraterrestrial places like Mars, asteroids, or the Moon (in-situ resource utilization [ISRU]; see Asteroid mining). One could produce breathing oxygen, drinking water, and rocket fuel with the help of ISRU. It may become possible to manufacture solar panels from lunar materials.

Asteroids and other small bodies
Most asteroids have a mixture of materials, that could be mined, and because these bodies do not have substantial gravity wells, it would require low delta-V to draw materials from them and haul them to a construction site.

There is estimated to be enough material in the main asteroid belt alone to build enough space habitats to equal the habitable surface area of 3,000 Earths.

Population
A 1974 estimate assumed that collection of all the material in the main asteroid belt would allow habitats to be constructed to give an immense total population capacity. Using the free-floating resources of the Solar System, this estimate extended into the trillions.

Zero g recreation
If a large area at the rotation axis is enclosed, various zero-g sports are possible, including swimming, hang gliding and the use of human-powered aircraft.

Passenger compartment

A space habitat can be the passenger compartment of a large spacecraft for colonizing asteroids, moons, and planets. It can also function as one for a generation ship for travel to other planets or distant stars (L. R. Shepherd described a generation starship in 1952 comparing it to a small planet with many people living in it.)

Requirements

The requirements for a space habitat are many. They would have to provide all the material needs for hundreds or thousands of humans, in an environment out in space that is very hostile to human life.

Atmosphere
Air pressure, with normal partial pressures of oxygen (21%), carbon dioxide and nitrogen (78%), is a basic requirement of any space habitat. Basically, most space habitat designs concepts envision large, thin-walled pressure vessels. The required oxygen could be obtained from lunar rock. Nitrogen is most easily available from the Earth, but is also recycled nearly perfectly. Also, nitrogen in the form of ammonia may be obtainable from comets and the moons of outer planets. Nitrogen may also be available in unknown quantities on certain other bodies in the outer Solar System. The air of a habitat could be recycled in a number of ways. One concept is to use photosynthetic gardens, possibly via hydroponics, or forest gardening. However, these do not remove certain industrial pollutants, such as volatile oils, and excess simple molecular gases. The standard method used on nuclear submarines, a similar form of closed environment, is to use a catalytic burner, which effectively decomposes most organics. Further protection might be provided by a small cryogenic distillation system which would gradually remove impurities such as mercury vapor, and noble gases that cannot be catalytically burned.

Food production
Organic materials for food production would also need to be provided. At first, most of these would have to be imported from Earth.  After that, feces recycling should reduce the need for imports. One proposed recycling method would start by burning the cryogenic distillate, plants, garbage and sewage with air in an electric arc, and distilling the result. The resulting carbon dioxide and water would be immediately usable in agriculture. The nitrates and salts in the ash could be dissolved in water and separated into pure minerals. Most of the nitrates, potassium and sodium salts would recycle as fertilizers. Other minerals containing iron, nickel, and silicon could be chemically purified in batches and reused industrially. The small fraction of remaining materials, well below 0.01% by weight, could be processed into pure elements with zero-gravity mass spectrometry, and added in appropriate amounts to the fertilizers and industrial stocks. It is likely that methods would be greatly refined as people began to actually live in space habitats.

Artificial gravity

Long-term on-orbit studies have proven that zero gravity weakens bones and muscles, and upsets calcium metabolism and immune systems. Most people have a continual stuffy nose or sinus problems, and a few people have dramatic, incurable motion sickness. Most habitat designs would rotate in order to use inertial forces to simulate gravity. NASA studies with chickens and plants have proven that this is an effective physiological substitute for gravity. Turning one's head rapidly in such an environment causes a "tilt" to be sensed as one's inner ears move at different rotational rates. Centrifuge studies show that people get motion-sick in habitats with a rotational radius of less than 100 metres, or with a rotation rate above 3 rotations per minute. However, the same studies and statistical inference indicate that almost all people should be able to live comfortably in habitats with a rotational radius larger than 500 meters and below 1 RPM. Experienced persons were not merely more resistant to motion sickness, but could also use the effect to determine "spinward" and "antispinward" directions in the centrifuges.

Protection from radiation

If a space habitat is located at L4 or L5, then its orbit will take it outside of the protection of the Earth's magnetosphere for approximately two-thirds of the time (as happens with the Moon), putting residents at risk of proton exposure from the solar wind (see Health threat from cosmic rays). Water walls or ice walls can provide protection from solar and cosmic radiation, as 7 cm of water depth blocks approximately half of incident radiation. Alternatively, rock could be used as shielding; 4 metric tons per square meter of surface area could reduce radiation dosage to several mSv or less annually, below the rate of some populated high natural background areas on Earth. Alternative concepts based on active shielding are untested yet and more complex than such passive mass shielding, but usage of magnetic and/or electric fields to deflect particles could potentially greatly reduce mass requirements.

Heat rejection
The habitat is in a vacuum, and therefore resembles a giant thermos bottle. Habitats also need a radiator to eliminate heat from absorbed sunlight. Very small habitats might have a central vane that rotates with the habitat. In this design, convection would raise hot air "up" (toward the center), and cool air would fall down into the outer habitat. Some other designs would distribute coolants, such as chilled water from a central radiator.

Meteoroids and dust
The habitat would need to withstand potential impacts from space debris, meteoroids, dust, etc. Most meteoroids that strike the earth vaporize in the atmosphere. Without a thick protective atmosphere meteoroid strikes would pose a much greater risk to a space habitat. Radar will sweep the space around each habitat mapping the trajectory of debris and other man-made objects and allowing corrective actions to be taken to protect the habitat.

In some designs (O'Neill/NASA Ames "Stanford Torus" and "Crystal palace in a Hatbox" habitat designs have a non-rotating cosmic ray shield of packed sand (~1.9 m thick) or even artificial aggregate rock (1.7 m ersatz concrete). Other proposals use the rock as structure and integral shielding (O'Neill, "the High Frontier". Sheppard, "Concrete Space Colonies"; Spaceflight, journal of the B.I.S.) In any of these cases, strong meteoroid protection is implied by the external radiation shell ~4.5 tonnes of rock material, per square meter.

Note that Solar Power Satellites are proposed in the multi-GW ranges, and such energies and technologies would allow constant radar mapping of nearby 3D space out-to arbitrarily far away, limited only by effort expended to do so.

Proposals are available to move even kilometer-sized NEOs to high Earth orbits, and reaction engines for such purposes would move a space habitat and any arbitrarily large shield, but not in any timely or rapid manner, the thrust being very low compared to the huge mass.

Attitude control
Most mirror geometries require something on the habitat to be aimed at the sun and so attitude control is necessary. The original O'Neill design used the two cylinders as momentum wheels to roll the colony, and pushed the sunward pivots together or apart to use precession to change their angle.

Considerations

Initial capital outlay
Even the smallest of the habitat designs mentioned below are more massive than the total mass of all items that humans have ever launched into Earth orbit combined. Prerequisites to building habitats are either cheaper launch costs or a mining and manufacturing base on the Moon or other body having low delta-v from the desired habitat location.

Location
The optimal habitat orbits are still debated, and so orbital stationkeeping is probably a commercial issue. The lunar  and  orbits are now thought to be too far away from the moon and Earth. A more modern proposal is to use a two-to-one resonance orbit that alternately has a close, low-energy (cheap) approach to the Moon, and then to the Earth. This provides quick, inexpensive access to both raw materials and the major market. Most habitat designs plan to use electromagnetic tether propulsion, or mass drivers used instead of rocket motors. The advantage of these is that they either use no reaction mass at all, or use cheap reaction mass.

Conceptual studies

O'Neill - The High Frontier

Around 1970, near the end of Project Apollo (1961–1972), Gerard K. O'Neill, an experimental physicist at Princeton University, was looking for a topic to tempt his physics students, most of them freshmen in engineering. He hit upon the idea of assigning them feasibility calculations for large space-habitats. Also, the students solved problems such as radiation protection from cosmic rays (almost free in the larger sizes), getting naturalistic Sun angles, provision of power, realistic pest-free farming and orbital attitude control without reaction motors. O'Neill published an article about these colony concepts in Physics Today in 1974. (See the above illustration of such a colony, a classic "O'Neill Colony"). He expanded the article in his 1976 book The High Frontier: Human Colonies in Space.

NASA Ames/Stanford 1975 Summer Study
The result motivated NASA to sponsor a couple of summer workshops led by O'Neill. Several concepts were studied, with sizes ranging from 1,000 to 10,000,000 people, including versions of the Stanford torus. Three concepts were presented to NASA: the Bernal Sphere, the Toroidal Colony and the Cylindrical Colony.

O'Neill's concepts had an example of a payback scheme: construction of solar power satellites from lunar materials. O'Neill did not emphasize the building of solar power satellites as such, but rather offered proof that orbital manufacturing from lunar materials could generate profits. He and other participants presumed that once such manufacturing facilities had started production, many profitable uses for them would be found, and the colony would become self-supporting and begin to build other colonies as well.

The concept studies generated a notable groundswell of public interest. One effect of this expansion was the founding of the L5 Society in the U.S., a group of enthusiasts that desired to build and live in such colonies. The group was named after the space-colony orbit which was then believed to be the most profitable, a kidney-shaped orbit around either of Earth's lunar Lagrange points 5 or 4.

Space Studies Institute
In 1977 O'Neill founded the Space Studies Institute, which initially funded and constructed some prototypes of the new hardware needed for a space colonization effort, as well as producing a number of feasibility studies. One of the early projects, for instance, involved a series of functional prototypes of a mass driver, the essential technology for moving ores efficiently from the Moon to space colony orbits.

NASA concepts
Some NASA concept studies included:
 Island One, a Bernal sphere habitat for about 10,000–20,000 people. 
 Stanford torus: an alternative to Island One.
 O'Neill cylinder: "Island Three", an even larger design (3.2 km radius and 32 km long).
 Lewis One: A cylinder of radius 250 m with a non rotating radiation shielding. The shielding protects the micro-gravity industrial space, too. The rotating part is 450m long and has several inner cylinders. Some of them are used for agriculture.
 Kalpana One, revised: A short cylinder with 250 m radius and 325 m length. The radiation shielding is 10 t/m2 and rotates. It has several inner cylinders for agriculture and recreation. It is sized for 3,000 residents.
 A bola: a spacecraft or habitat connected by a cable to a counterweight or other habitat. This design has been proposed as a Mars ship, initial construction shack for a space habitat, and orbital hotel. It has a comfortably long and slow rotational radius for a relatively small station mass. Also, if some of the equipment can form the counter-weight, the equipment dedicated to artificial gravity is just a cable, and thus has a much smaller mass-fraction than in other concepts. For a long-term habitation, however, radiation shielding must rotate with the habitat, and is extremely heavy, thus requiring a much stronger and heavier cable.
 Beaded habitats: This speculative design was also considered by the NASA studies. Small habitats would be mass-produced to standards that allow the habitats to interconnect. A single habitat can operate alone as a bola. However, further habitats can be attached, to grow into a "dumbbell" then a "bow-tie", then a ring, then a cylinder of "beads", and finally a framed array of cylinders. Each stage of growth shares more radiation shielding and capital equipment, increasing redundancy and safety while reducing the cost per person. This concept was originally proposed by a professional architect because it can grow much like Earth-bound cities, with incremental individual investments, unlike those that require large start-up investments. The main disadvantage is that the smaller versions use a large structure to support the radiation shielding, which rotates with them. In large sizes, the shielding becomes economical, because it grows roughly as the square of the colony radius. The number of people, their habitats, and the radiators to cool them grow roughly as the cube of the colony radius.

Other concepts

Bubbleworld: The Bubbleworld or Inside/Outside concept was originated by Dandridge M. Cole in 1964. The concept calls for drilling a tunnel through the longest axis of a large asteroid of iron or nickel-iron composition and filling it with a volatile substance, possibly water. A very large solar reflector would be constructed nearby, focusing solar heat onto the asteroid, first to weld and seal the tunnel ends, then more diffusely to slowly heat the entire outer surface. As the metal softens, the water inside expands and inflates the mass, while rotational forces help shape it into a cylindrical form. Once expanded and allowed to cool, it can be spun to produce artificial gravity by centrifugation, and the interior filled with soil, air and water. By creating a slight bulge in the middle of the cylinder, a ring-shaped lake can be made to form. Reflectors would allow sunlight to enter and to be directed where needed. This method would require a significant human and industrial presence in space to be at all feasible. The concept was popularized by science fiction author Larry Niven in his Known Space stories, describing such worlds as the primary habitats of the Belters, a civilization who had colonized the asteroid belt.
 Asteroid terrarium: a similar idea to the bubble world, the asteroid terrarium, appears in the 2012 novel 2312, authored by hard science fiction writer Kim Stanley Robinson.
Bishop Ring: a speculative design using carbon nanotubes, a Bishop Ring is a torus 1000 km in radius, 500 km in width, and with atmosphere retention walls 200 km in height. The habitat would be large enough that it could be "roofless", open to outer space on the inner rim.
McKendree cylinder: another concept that would use carbon nanotubes, a McKendree cylinder is paired cylinders in the same vein as the Island Three concept, but each 460 km in radius and 4600 km long (versus 3.2 km radius and 32 km long in the Island Three).

Gallery

Current projects
The following projects and proposals, while not truly space habitats, incorporate aspects of what they would have and may represent stepping stones towards eventually building of space habitats.

The Nautilus-X Multi-Mission Space Exploration Vehicle (MMSEV): this 2011 NASA proposal for a long-duration crewed space transport vehicle included an artificial gravity compartment intended to promote crew-health for a crew of up to six persons on missions of up to two years duration. The partial-g torus-ring centrifuge would utilize both standard metal-frame and inflatable spacecraft structures and would provide 0.11 to  if built with the  diameter option.

The ISS Centrifuge Demo, also proposed in 2011 as a demonstration project preparatory to the final design of the larger torus centrifuge space habitat for the Multi-Mission Space Exploration Vehicle. This test and evaluation centrifuge would have the capability to become a Sleep Module for ISS crew.

The Bigelow Commercial Space Station was announced in mid-2010. The initial build-out of the station is expected in 2014/2015. Bigelow has publicly shown space station design configurations with up to nine modules containing  of habitable space. Bigelow began to publicly refer to the initial configuration as "Space Complex Alpha" in October 2010.

See also

 Bioastronautics
 Domed city
 Dyson sphere
 Floating cities and islands in fiction
 Human outpost (artificially created controlled human habitat)
 Locomotion in space
 Megastructure
 Planetary chauvinism
 
 Space architecture
 
 Space stations and habitats in fiction
 Spaceflight
 Space station
 Spome
 Underground living
 Underground city
 Underwater habitat

Notes

References

NASA's table of contents for the studies See the "online books" about halfway down the page.

External links
Lifeboat Foundation Space Habitats, a space habitat advocacy group.

NASA video about space habitats and space settlements construction as seen around 1970"s (5 min)
 Video explaining rotating space habitats
 Opening the High Frontier, a video about affordable spaceflight and building a spacefaring civilization.
The 1975 space habitat video credited with inspiring Blue Origin (Jeff "Amazon" Bezos as a boy).
Segits.com, a website that refers to Space habitats as Segits or Self-sufficient Extra-terrestrial Green-habitat Intentional Transparent self-replicating communities.

 
Human habitats
Space farming